Dorcadion etruscum is a species of beetle in the family Cerambycidae. It was described by Rossi in 1790, originally as a varias of the species Lamia molitor. It is known from Italy, Greece, North Macedonia, Albania, and Sicily.

Subspecies
 Dorcadion etruscum bravardi Pic, 1916
 Dorcadion etruscum etruscum (Rossi, 1790)
 Dorcadion etruscum fiorii Breuning, 1942

References

etruscum
Beetles described in 1790